Anselmo Tadeu Silva do Nascimento (born October 24, 1980), commonly known as Anselmo Tadeu, or Anselmo, is a Brazilian footballer, who plays forward for Club Sportivo Sergipe.

He started his career in Palmeiras in 1998 and has since represented a large group of Brazilian clubs between 2003 and 2008. He made a short spell outside Brazil in 2003 when he played for Qatari club Al-Sailiya Sport Club. In 2008, Halmstads BK, looking for a replacement for Dusan Djuric, who had left for FC Zurich, chose to sign Anselmo; costing 3 million SEK, he became the most expensive player the club ever had bought so far. As Anselmos contract ended and the Halmstad unable to provide the amounts Anselmo wished for to sign a new contract, he departed the club and signed for Brazilian club Botafogo (SP).

Honours
 Ceará
 Campeonato Cearense: 2013

Tombense
 Campeonato Brasileiro Série D: 2014
 Ceará
 Campeonato Cearense: 2016

Santo André
 Campeonato Paulista Série A2: 2019

References

External links
HBK profile 
Swedish FA profile 
Anselmo Official Website  

1980 births
Living people
Brazilian expatriate footballers
Association football forwards
Expatriate footballers in Qatar
Expatriate footballers in Sweden
Expatriate footballers in China
Brazilian expatriate sportspeople in Qatar
Brazilian expatriate sportspeople in Sweden
Brazilian expatriate sportspeople in China
Campeonato Brasileiro Série A players
Campeonato Brasileiro Série B players
Campeonato Brasileiro Série C players
Campeonato Brasileiro Série D players
Allsvenskan players
Chinese Super League players
Qatar Stars League players
Sociedade Esportiva Palmeiras players
Sociedade Esportiva do Gama players
Al-Sailiya SC players
Associação Atlética Ponte Preta players
Clube Náutico Capibaribe players
Paysandu Sport Club players
Clube Atlético Mineiro players
Criciúma Esporte Clube players
Boavista Sport Club players
CR Vasco da Gama players
Avaí FC players
Halmstads BK players
Botafogo Futebol Clube (SP) players
Atlético Clube Goianiense players
Shanghai Shenxin F.C. players
Ceará Sporting Club players
Clube Atlético Linense players
Tombense Futebol Clube players
Macaé Esporte Futebol Clube players
Fortaleza Esporte Clube players
Volta Redonda FC players
Esporte Clube Santo André players
Club Sportivo Sergipe players
Footballers from Rio de Janeiro (city)
Brazilian footballers